Dhungana (Devanagari ढुङ्गाना) is a Nepali surname originating among the bahun (बाहुन/ब्राह्मण) caste from a village named Dhungani in Western Nepal. In the ancient Kingdom of the Videhas, some people lived in mud houses while the Dhungana lived in stone houses, with ढुङ्गा meaning stone and ना/नः meaning "us".

Notable people with surname Dhungana include:
Neeta Dhungana, Nepalese actress
Ramit Dhungana, Nepalese actor

References
 
 Vedic Tradition in Nepal – Michael Witzel, 2003

Surnames of Nepalese origin